Gymnobathra flavidella is a moth of the family Oecophoridae. It is endemic to New Zealand. The host plants for the larvae of this species include Brachyglottis repanda and Gahnia procera.

Taxonomy 
This species was first described by Francis Walker in 1864 using the name Gelechia flavidella.

Description 

The forewings of this species measure between 4.5mm and 8.5mm in length.

G.V. Hudson described the species as follows:

Distribution 
This species is found only in New Zealand. It is common in all areas of the North Island and in the top half of the South Island as far as Christchurch and Franz Josef.

Host species 
The larvae of G. flavidella live within and feed on Brachyglottis repanda. Gahnia procera has also been recorded as a host species.

References

External links

 Gymnobathra flavidella in species-id

Moths described in 1864
Oecophoridae
Moths of New Zealand
Endemic fauna of New Zealand
Taxa named by Francis Walker (entomologist)
Endemic moths of New Zealand